YugoRosGaz a.d. is a Serbian natural gas distributor and transportation company, a subsidiary of Russian Gazprom. It is headquartered in Belgrade, Serbia.

Ownership
YugoRosGaz is owned by Gazprom (50%), Srbijagas (25%), and Central ME Energy & Gas AG (25%), a member of the Centrex Group. Srbijagas has an option to purchase up to 49% of the company.

See also
 List of Gazprom subsidiaries

References

External links
 

Oil and gas companies of Serbia
Gazprom subsidiaries
Energy companies established in 1996
Companies based in Belgrade
Serbian companies established in 1996